The Yinchuan–Baise Expressway, designated as G69 and commonly referred to as the Yinbai Expressway, is a partially completed expressway in China. It is a major north-south expressway that when complete, will connect the cities of Yinchuan, the capital of Ningxia, with Longbang town in Baise, in the autonomous region of Guangxi. The expressway was announced as one of the eleven primary north-south expressways in China's expressway network on 24 May 2013.

References 

Chinese national-level expressways
Expressways in Ningxia
Expressways in Gansu
Expressways in Shaanxi
Expressways in Chongqing
Expressways in Guizhou
Expressways in Guangxi